Seaman's Furniture was an American chain of furniture stores based in Woodbury, New York.

History

The company was founded by Julius Seaman in 1933 with its first store in Brooklyn, New York. The chain was in business for more than 70 years until it merged into Levitz in 2005.

On February 8, 1990, Seaman's Furniture announced that Morton and Jeffrey Seaman would leave the company; it was later succeeded by Matthew D. Serra, former president and chief executive of G. Fox.

The chain was known for its slogan, "See Seaman's First".

In popular culture

Seaman's Furniture is mentioned in a song by hip hop group A Tribe Called Quest. In the song "Electric Relaxation" on their third album, "Midnight Marauders," Phife Dawg utters the ribald lyric: "Let me hit it from the back, girl/I won't catch a hernia/Bust off on your couch/Now you got Seaman's furniture."

See also 
 Levitz Furniture
 Rooms To Go

References

External links 
 Seamans Furniture Corporate History

Retail companies established in 1933
Retail companies disestablished in 2005